Gertrude Ntiti Shope (born 15 August 1925) is a South African former trade unionist and politician.

Life and career
Born in Johannesburg on 15 August 1925, Shope was raised and educated in Southern Rhodesia (now Zimbabwe). She worked as a teacher before becoming a member of the African National Congress in 1954. Joining the campaign against Bantu education, she turned to teaching crafts instead. She then became active in the Federation of South African Women, and for a time led the Central Western Jabavu Branch of the ANC women's section. She lived in exile from 1966 to 1990, leading the party's delegation to the Nairobi Women's Meeting and working for the World Federation of Trade Unions. From 1970 until 1971 she was secretary to Florence Moposho, helping to establish publication of the newsletter Voice of Women. With her husband, Mark, she lived in a variety of locations during her exile, including Prague, Botswana, Tanzania, Czechoslovakia, Zambia, and Nigeria. In Lusaka she served as chief representative for the African National Congress. From 1991 to 1993 Shope headed the African National Congress Women's League. In the 1994 general election she was returned to parliament.

References

1925 births
Living people
20th-century South African women politicians
20th-century South African politicians
Anti-apartheid activists
South African women activists
South African women trade unionists
South African expatriates in Southern Rhodesia
Members of the National Assembly of South Africa
People from Johannesburg
Women members of the National Assembly of South Africa
Women civil rights activists